Edward Kozlowski (November 21, 1860 – August 7, 1915) was a Polish-American prelate of the Roman Catholic Church who served as an auxiliary bishop for the Archdiocese of Milwaukee, in Milwaukee, Wisconsin. He was the first Polish bishop for Milwaukee.

Biography
Edward Kozłowski was born on November 21, 1860, in Tarnów, in the Austrian portion of Poland. He came to the United States in 1885, first settling in Chicago and then studying for the priesthood at St. Francis Seminary in Milwaukee. After pacifying one violent Polish parish in Michigan, he was sent to an even more violent one in Manistee. Shots had been fired at the previous priest, and Kozlowski’s calming presence brought peace to a tense situation. Kozlowski showed the gift of not only working with combatant Poles but also maintaining good relations with the local German archbishop, who was often at odds with the parishioners.

Father Kozlowski was then transferred to Milwaukee and named pastor of St. Stanislaus Parish in an attempt to calm an extremely tense situation there as well. There had been considerable strife between the local Polish parishes and the Archdiocese of Milwaukee, which was run by German and Irish clergy. The local Polish language paper Kuryer Polski of Polish activist and politician Michał Kruszka had been agitating for greater representation within the local church hierarchy. As numerous Poles did not speak English and worked at the bottom of the social economic ladder, many within the Archdiocese felt that the Poles were not "American enough" to participate in the church leadership. This situation had eventually led to a split within the church, and a branch of the rival Polish National Catholic Church had been established in Milwaukee. It was thought that Father Kozlowski's skills as a mediator would find a solution to bring both parties together and heal the wounds.

On January 14, 1914, amid much celebration, Father Kozlowski was named as Milwaukee's first Polish bishop by Pope Pius X. He was only the second Polish-speaking Bishop appointed in America, following the appointment of Bishop Paul Peter Rhode in Chicago in 1908. A parade was organized at the Cathedral of St. John the Evangelist, where Father Kozlowski had been consecrated, and passed along Milwaukee’s streets, which had been lit with torches. A carriage pulled by four horses took Bishop Kozlowski to St. Stanislaus, which was filled to capacity. An estimated 50,000 gathered at St. Stanislaus church just to catch a glimpse.

Bishop Kozlowski worked tirelessly to heal wounds among the parishioners in Milwaukee as well as to address grievances of Polish priests, who had lower salaries than their German and Irish brethren.

But only one year after his appointment, Bishop Kozlowski fell ill from blood poisoning and died on August 7, 1915. The pride of “Stanisławowo” had died. Some 30,000 mourners attended the funeral. Chicago Bishop Paul Rhode declared at the memorial service: “How difficult it was for us to obtain a second Polish bishop, and how easy to lose him”.

He is buried in Saint Adalberts Cemetery, in Milwaukee.

See also
Michael Kruszka
Wacław Kruszka

References 

 Borun, Thaddeus, We, the Milwaukee Poles (Milwaukee: Nowiny Publishing Co. 1946)
 Kruszka, Wacław “A History of Poles In America to 1908” (Washington D.C. 2001)
 Avella, Steven M. In the Richness of the Earth (Milwaukee: Marquette University Press, 2002)
 Kuznewski, Anthony J., Faith and Fatherland: The Polish Church War in Wisconsin, 1896–1918(Notre Dame: Notre Dame Press 1980) JSTOR review

External links
Polish Churches of Milwaukee

1860 births
1915 deaths
American people of Polish descent
Austro-Hungarian emigrants to the United States
History of Catholicism in the United States
People from the Kingdom of Galicia and Lodomeria
People from Tarnów
Religious leaders from Wisconsin
20th-century Roman Catholic bishops in the United States
Roman Catholic Archdiocese of Milwaukee